Wilfried Wesemael (born  31 January 1950) is a Belgian former professional racing cyclist. He won the 1979 Tour de Suisse. He also competed in the individual and team pursuit events at the 1972 Summer Olympics.

Major results

1974
 1st Kuurne–Brussels–Kuurne
 2nd Elfstedenronde
 2nd Omloop van het Leiedal
 2nd Brussels–Meulebeke
 5th Rund um den Henninger Turm
 6th Grand Prix Cerami
 10th Tour of Flanders
1975
 1st Stage 1 Vuelta a España
 10th Nokere Koerse
1976
 5th Grand Prix de Fourmies
 7th Overall Paris–Nice
 10th Milan–San Remo
 10th Omloop Het Volk
1977
 1st Prologue (TTT) Three Days of De Panne
 2nd Overall Tour Méditerranéen
 2nd Grote Prijs Jef Scherens
 3rd Milan–San Remo
 5th E3 Prijs Vlaanderen
 10th Omloop Het Volk
1978
 1st Grand Prix de Cannes
 1st Stage 4 (TTT) Tour de France
 2nd Overall Tour de Luxembourg
 3rd Grand Prix Cerami
 4th GP Monaco
 7th Overall Three Days of De Panne
 7th Overall Tour Méditerranéen
1979
 1st  Overall Tour de Suisse
 1st Stage 7 Critérium du Dauphiné Libéré
1980
 5th Overall Tour Méditerranéen
1981
 1st Stage 5 (TTT) Tour of Belgium
 9th Overall Four Days of Dunkirk

References

External links

1950 births
Living people
Belgian male cyclists
Belgian Tour de France stage winners
Belgian Vuelta a España stage winners
Sportspeople from Aalst, Belgium
Cyclists from East Flanders
Olympic cyclists of Belgium
Cyclists at the 1972 Summer Olympics